Grimstad is a village in Råde municipality, Norway. Since 2002 it has been considered a part of the Ryggebyen urban area.

References 

Villages in Østfold
Råde